Roberta Edgecombe Robb is a Canadian economist, and Professor Emeritus of Economics at Brock University. She is co-founder and past president of the Canadian Women Economists Network (CWEN). Her research primarily focuses on women's status in the workplace and related government policy.

Education and career
Robb attended the Memorial University of Newfoundland (MUN), where she graduated with a Bachelor of Arts.  She then completed a master's degree at UBC before taking a job with the Memorial University's department of economics. She later left this position to study for a PhD at the University of Essex (UK) and when she returned to Canada she took on a position at Brock University. Robb has served on the editorial board for the Canadian Journal of Economics from 1978 to 1981, as Chair of the Economics Department at Brock from 1986 to 1989, and as Director of the Women's Studies Program at Brock from 1999 to 2002. In 1990, Robb, with Lorraine Eden, co-founded the Canadian Women Economists Network. From 1997 to 1999, she served as president of CWEN.

CWEC/CFÉC Service Award

In 2019, Robb was recognized by the Canadian Women Economists Committee (CWEC/CFÉC)—successor organization to CWEN and part of the Canadian Economics Association—with the inaugural CWEC/CFÉC Service Award.

Select bibliography

References

External links
 Robb on worldcat.org
 CWEC Service Award announcement

Living people
Year of birth missing (living people)
Canadian economists
Canadian women economists